The sixth and final election to Dyfed County Council was held in May 1993. It was preceded by the 1989 election. In 1995 Welsh local government reorganization led to the abolition of the authority.

Overview

The Independents remained the largest party with Labour the nearest challenger.

Ward Results (Cardiganshire)

Aberporth
The sitting member had won the seat at a by-election.

Aberteifi

Aberystwyth North

Aberystwyth South

Beulah

Borth

Lampeter

Llanbadarn Fawr

Llandysiliogogo

Llandyfriog

Llanfihangel Ystrad

Llansantffraid
The seat had changed hands at a by-election.

Lledrod

Ystwyth

Ward Results (Carmarthenshire)

Abergwili

Ammanford

Bigyn

Burry Port

Carmarthen Town North

Carmarthen Town South

Carmarthen Town West

Elli

Felinfoel

Glanamman
Jack Davies, who had stood as an Independent Labour candidate at the previous two elections returned to the Labour fold.

Glanymor

Gorslas

Hengoed

Kidwelly

Llandovery

Llandybie

Llanedi

Llanegwad

Llanfihangel ar Arth

Llangadog

Llangeler

Llangennech

Llangyndeyrn
Boundary Change.

Llan-non

Llansteffan

Lliedi

Llwynhendy

Pembrey

Pontyberem

Quarter Bach

Saron

St Clears

Tyisha

Whitland

Ward Results (Pembrokeshire)

Camrose

Crymych

East Williamston

Fishguard

Hakin

Llangwm

Milford Central and East

Milford North and West
An attempt by the Liberal Democrats to win an additional seat as the sitting member for Milford Central and East changed wards was unsuccessful.

Narberth

Neyland

Pembroke St Mary

Pembroke St Michael

Pembroke Dock Llanion

Pembroke Dock Pennar

Portfield

Priory

Rudbaxton

St David's

St Dogmaels

Saundersfoot

Tenby

The Havens

References

1993
Dyfed